Heteroscarus acroptilus, the rainbow cale, is a species of weed whiting endemic to Australia where it is found in marine waters along the southern coast. It inhabits rocky reefs that have plentiful growth of brown algae and also in beds of seagrass, particularly those of the genus Posidonia. This species grows to a length of  SL. It can also be found in the aquarium trade. This species is the only known member of its genus.

References

Odacidae
Taxa named by John Richardson (naturalist)
Fish described in 1846